Riley may refer to:

Names
 Riley (given name)
 Riley (surname)

Places
 Riley Park–Little Mountain, a neighborhood in Vancouver, British Columbia, Canada
 Riley Creek (Ontario), a tributary of the Black River in Central Ontario, Canada
 Riley Green, hamlet in the Borough of Chorley, Lancashire, England
 Riley (crater), a crater on Venus

United States
 Fort Riley, US Army post in northeast Kansas
 Fort Riley (CDP), Kansas, a part of the post designated by the United States Census Bureau
 Riley, Indiana, town in Vigo County
 Riley, Hancock County, Indiana
 Riley, Oregon, small town in Harney County
 Riley, West Virginia
 Riley, Wisconsin, an unincorporated community
 Riley County, Kansas
 Riley, Kansas, a city in Riley County
 Riley Creek (Ohio), a stream in Ohio
 Riley Township, McHenry County, Illinois
 Riley Township, Vigo County, Indiana
 Riley Township, Clinton County, Michigan
 Riley Township, St. Clair County, Michigan
 Riley Township, Putnam County, Ohio
 Riley Township, Sandusky County, Ohio
 Riley Park (Sumter), baseball stadium in Sumter, South Carolina

Vehicles
 Riley Motor, British motorcar and bicycle manufacturer
 Riley Technologies, formerly Riley & Scott, American racing car manufacturer

Other uses
 Riley (horse), an American Thoroughbred racehorse
 Winter Storm Riley, the March 2018 nor'easter
 Riley, a Deutoragonist in Call of Duty: Ghosts

See also
 Florida v. Riley, US Supreme Court decision which held that police officials do not need a warrant to observe an individual's property from public airspace
 The Life of Riley (disambiguation)
 Ó Raghallaigh
 Reilly (disambiguation)
 Ryley (name)
 Ryley, Alberta, Canada
 O'Reilly
 O'Reilly (disambiguation)
 Justice Riley (disambiguation)